New Hampshire is a 1923 volume of poems written by Robert Frost which won the 1924 Pulitzer Prize for Poetry.

The book included several of Frost's most well-known poems, including "Stopping by Woods on a Snowy Evening", "Nothing Gold Can Stay" and "Fire and Ice".  Illustrations for the collection were provided by Frost's friend, woodcut artist J. J. Lankes.

Poems
 "New Hampshire"
 "A Star in a Stone-Boat"
 "The Census-Taker"
 "The Star-Splitter"
 "Maple"
 "The Ax-Helve"
 "The Grindstone"
 "Paul's Wife"
 "Wild Grapes"
 "Place for a Third"
 "Two Witches"
 "An Empty Threat"
 "A Fountain, a Bottle, a Donkey's Ears, and Some Books"
 "I Will Sing You One-O"
 "Fragmentary Blue"
 "Fire and Ice"
 "In a Disused Graveyard"
 "Dust of Snow"
 "To E.T."
 "Nothing Gold Can Stay"
 "The Runaway"
 "The Aim Was Song"
 "Stopping by Woods on a Snowy Evening"
 "For Once, Then, Something"
 "Blue-Butterfly Day"
 "The Onset"
 "To Earthward"
 "Good-by and Keep Cold"
 "Two Look at Two"
 "Not to Keep"
 "A Brook in the City"
 "The Kitchen Chimney"
 "Looking for a Sunset Bird in Winter"
 "A Boundless Moment"
 "Evening in a Sugar Orchard"
 "Gathering Leaves"
 "The Valley's Singing Day"
 "Misgiving"
 "A Hillside Thaw"
 "Plowmen"
 "On a Tree Fallen Across the Road"
 "Our Singing Strength"
 "The Lockless Door"
 "The Need of Being Versed in Country Things"

References

External links
 
 
 

1923 poetry books
American poetry collections
Henry Holt and Company books
New Hampshire culture
Pulitzer Prize for Poetry-winning works
Works by Robert Frost